The 1924 Ladies Open Championships was held at the Queen's Club, West Kensington in London from 3–8 December 1923. Nancy Cave won the title defeating her sister Joyce Cave in the final. This championship was held in the 1923 but in the 1923/24 season so is attributed as being the 1924 event.

Draw and results

Section A (round robin)

Section B (round robin)

Section C (round robin)

Section D (round robin)

Second round

Semi finals

Final

+ Mrs R G De Quetteville (née Molly Austin-Cartmell)
++ Honourable Mrs Edward Tew (née Catherine Hawke)

References

Women's British Open Squash Championships
Women's British Open Squash Championship
Women's British Open Squash Championship
Squash competitions in London
British Open Championship